Diklić is a Serbo-Croatian surname, predominantly borne by ethnic Serbs. It may refer to:

Arsen Diklić (1922–1995), Yugoslav Serbian poet, novelist and film director
Bogdan Diklić (born 1953), Yugoslav and Serbian actor 
Jasna Diklić (born 1946), Yugoslav and Bosnian actress
Spomenka Hribar née Diklić (born 1941), Slovenian author, philosopher, sociologist, politician, columnist, and public intellectual

See also
Diklići (disambiguation)

Serbian surnames
Croatian surnames